Little Bit A Blues is an American folk and blues  trio comprising Warner Williams, Jay Summerour and Eric Selby, until Williams' death in 2021.  They played at numerous folk and blues festivals and at concerts at the Smithsonian Institution in Washington, D.C., and were known for playing in the Piedmont blues style, a regional variant of the blues that developed in North Carolina, South Carolina, Virginia, Maryland and West Virginia.

History
Williams and Summerour played music together under the name of Little Bit A Blues from the early 1990s. During their tenure together, they recorded several albums, including for the Smithsonian Folkways label.   Eric Selby later joined up with Williams and Summerour, completing the trio.

Their recording, The Best of Little Bit A Blues: Live at B.B. King's Bluesville, on Soul Stew Records reached number one on the Blues411 chart, was nominated for a WAMMIE for Blues/Traditional R&B Recording of the Year as well as received a JIMI Award for Best Live Recording of the Year.

Williams was a recipient of a 2011 National Heritage Fellowship awarded by the National Endowment for the Arts, which is the United States government's highest honor in the folk and traditional arts.

Williams was from Takoma Park, Maryland, Summerour from Rockville, Maryland, and Selby from Washington Grove, Maryland.  Williams died in September 2021, aged 91.

Discography
Blues Highway (Smithsonian Folkways, 2004)
Classic African-American Ballads (Smithsonian Folkways, 2006)
The Best of Little Bit A Blues: Live at B.B. King's Bluesville (Soul Stew Records, 2013)

References

External links
  Entry for Warner Williams
  Entry for Jay Summerour
  Entry for Eric Selby

1990s establishments in Maryland
American folk musical groups
American musical duos
National Heritage Fellowship winners
Musical groups established in the 1990s
Piedmont blues musicians
American blues musicians
Musicians from Maryland
Musicians from Rockville, Maryland